The Roman Catholic Diocese of Uruaçu is a diocese located in the city of Uruaçu in the Ecclesiastical province of Brasília in Brazil.

On June 17, 2020, Giovanni Carlos Caldas Barroca, a priest of the Brasilia archdiocese, was appointed the new Bishop here.

History
 1956.03.26: Established as Diocese of Uruaçu from the Metropolitan Archdiocese of Goiás

Bishops
 Bishops of Uruaçu (Roman rite), in reverse chronological order
 Bishop-Elect Giovanni Carlos Caldas Barroca (2020.06.17 – ...)
 Bishop Messias dos Reis Silveira (2007.01.03 – 2018.11.14), appointed Bishop of Teófilo Otoni, Minas Gerais
 Bishop José da Silva Chaves (1976.05.14 – 2007.01.03)
 Bishop Francisco Prada Carrera, C.M.F. (1957.01.17 – 1976.02.25)

Auxiliary bishop
José da Silva Chaves (1967-1976), appointed Bishop here

Other priests of this diocese who became bishops
Adair José Guimarães, appointed Bishop of Rubiataba-Mozarlândia, Goias in 2008
José Francisco Rodrigues do Rêgo, appointed Bishop of Ipameri, Goias in 2019

Sources
 GCatholic.org
 Catholic Hierarchy
 Diocese website 

Roman Catholic dioceses in Brazil
Christian organizations established in 1956
Uruacu, Roman Catholic Diocese of
Roman Catholic dioceses and prelatures established in the 20th century